Dorothy Parkinson (–1925) was an English woman who created the first example of Preesall salt in 1872.
In 1872, while her father, John, was landlord of the Black Bull Inn in Preesall, Lancashire, a "syndicate of men" from Barrow-in-Furness stayed at the inn during their search for iron ore in the area. None was to be found, but they did discover a bed of rock salt, from which they took a sample. Upon returning to the inn, Dorothy processed the sample by dissolving, filtering and boiling it, thus creating the very first example of Preesall salt. In 1902, Preesall Salt Works was built to the north of the village's salt marshes, on the east bank of the River Wyre.

Personal life 
On 5 July 1876, Dorothy married another John Parkinson at St James' Church in Stalmine and spent her life as a farmer's wife at Hackensall Hall Farm, where she raised nine children.

Death 
Parksinson died in 1925, aged around 70.

References 

1855 births
1925 deaths
People from Lancashire (before 1974)